The Mozambique women's national cricket team represents the country of Mozambique in women's cricket matches.

In April 2018, the International Cricket Council (ICC) granted full Women's Twenty20 International (WT20I) status to all its members. Therefore, all Twenty20 matches played between Mozambique women and another international side since 1 July 2018 have been full WT20I matches.

Mozambique's first WT20I matches were contested as part of the Botswana 7s tournament in August 2018 against Botswana, Lesotho, Malawi, Namibia, Sierra Leone and Zambia (Zambia's matches were not classified as WT20Is as they had a Botswanan player in their squad). Mozambique finished fourth on the table with two wins and three losses and lost the third place play off against Botswana by a margin of nine wickets.

In November 2019, Mozambique Women's team participated in T20 Kwacha Cup which was a 7-match bilateral T20I series against Malawi. All the 7 matches were played at Saint Andrews International High School in Blantyre, Malawi. Mozambique women lost the series by 3-4.

In December 2020, the ICC announced the qualification pathway for the 2023 ICC Women's T20 World Cup. Mozambique were named in the 2021 ICC Women's T20 World Cup Africa Qualifier regional group, alongside ten other teams.

Records and Statistics 

International Match Summary — Mozambique Women
 
Last updated 31 July 2022

Twenty20 International 

 Highest team total: 219/4 v. Eswatini, 30 July 2022 at Enjabulweni Cricket Ground, Manzini.
 Highest individual score: 71, Olga Mondlane v. Lesotho, 21 August 2018 at Botswana Cricket Association Oval 2, Gaborone.
 Best individual bowling figures: 5/19, Paula Mazuze v. Malawi, 8 November 2019 at Saint Andrews International High School, Blantyre.

Most T20I runs for Mozambique Women

Most T20I wickets for Mozambique Women

T20I record versus other nations

Records complete to T20I #1182. Last updated 31 July 2022.

See also
 List of Mozambique women Twenty20 International cricketers

References

Women's
Women's national cricket teams
Cricket